László Balogh (9 September 1958 – April 2019) was a Hungarian sport shooter who competed in the 1988 Summer Olympics.

References

1958 births
2019 deaths
Hungarian male sport shooters
ISSF pistol shooters
Olympic shooters of Hungary
Shooters at the 1988 Summer Olympics
Road incident deaths in Hungary
20th-century Hungarian people